Aap Ki Khatir is a term in Hindi meaning "just for your sake". It is the title of three Hindi movies :

 Aap Ki Khatir (1977 film), a Bollywood film directed by Sudhendu Roy
 Aap Ki Khatir (1980 film), see Pakistani films of 1980
 Aap Ki Khatir (2006 film), a Bollywood film directed by Dharmesh Darshan